Cellino may refer to:

3857 Cellino, a main-belt asteroid
Cellino Attanasio, an Italian municipality of the Province of Teramo, Abruzzo
Cellino San Marco, an Italian municipality of the Province of Brindisi, Apulia

People with the surname
Massimo Cellino, Italian-American businessman